Nhyoe Thaw Pinlal Swal Ngin Thaw Lamin is a 2003 Burmese drama film, directed by Kyi Phyu Shin starring Dwe and Htun Eaindra Bo.

Cast
Dwe as Phone Htut Nay
Htun Eaindra Bo as Piti Cho
Byite as Wunna
Nyi Nyi Nay Naing as Nyi Lin Htin
Yadanar Khin as Shwe Yoon
Kin Kaung as Nanda
Nga Pyaw Kyaw as Kyaw Kyaw
Saw Naing as U Min Khant
Gone Pone as Pae Pae
Tin Tin Hla as Daw Ma Ma Cho

References

2003 films
2000s Burmese-language films
Burmese drama films
Films shot in Myanmar
2003 drama films